James Leroy Bondsteel (July 18, 1947 – April 9, 1987) was a United States Army soldier who served during the Vietnam War, where he earned the Medal of Honor.  His Medal of Honor, awarded in November 1973, was the last presented by President Richard Nixon.

Camp Bondsteel, located in Kosovo, is named in his honor.

Biography
James Leroy Bondsteel was born in Jackson, Michigan to Betty Jean Daisy and her fiancé, Kenneth Bondsteel. He enlisted in the United States Marine Corps in 1965 after graduating from Jonesville High School in Jonesville, Michigan. 

Bondsteel enlisted in the U.S. Marine Corps in 1965 and was posted to Korea where he contributed his time to an orphanage. His contract in the Marine Corps concluded. He then enlisted the United States Army, serving until his retirement in 1985. In 1969 he was deployed to Vietnam with Company A, 2nd Battalion, 2nd Infantry Regiment, 1st Infantry Division  (Army) where he received the Medal of Honor (MoH) for his actions occurring May 24, 1969 near An Lộc, South Vietnam during Operation Toan Thang III. During his time in Vietnam, Bondsteel learned to speak Vietnamese and could differentiate between different regional dialects. After leaving Vietnam Bondsteel was stationed in West Germany from 1970 to 1973. He was also stationed at numerous other postings until his retirement in 1985. In total, he accrued more than 20-years of service. After having achieved the rank of Master Sargeant (MSG/E-8) he retired honorably from the Army. He then went on to work for the Veterans Administration (VA) as a counselor at the regional office in Anchorage, Alaska. 

He lived in Willow, Alaska with his wife Elaine and his daughters, Angel and Rachel.

Bondsteel died on the Knik River bridge of the Glenn Highway in 1987 when a trailer full of logs came unhooked from the transport which was pulling it and slammed into the front of his AMC Spirit.

A tree was placed at Freedoms Foundation Park at Valley Forge, Pennsylvania, in his honor.

Bondsteel is buried in Alaska at Fort Richardson National Cemetery.

There is a monument to him at the Alaska Veterans Memorial at Byers Lake on the Parks Highway in the Denali State Park.

The bridge where he died is named in his honor.

Camp Bondsteel, the main U.S. Army base in Kosovo, is named in his honor.

Bondsteel, along with three other Medal of Honor recipients who were from the area, is honored on the Medal of Honor Memorial in Jackson County, Michigan, dedicated on November 22, 2011.

Medal of Honor citation
''Citation:

For conspicuous gallantry and intrepidity in action at the risk of his life above and beyond the call of duty. SSG Bondsteel distinguished himself while serving as a platoon sergeant with Company A, near the village of Lang Sau. Company A was directed to assist a friendly unit which was endangered by intense fire from a North Vietnamese Battalion located in a heavily fortified base camp. SSG Bondsteel quickly organized the men of his platoon into effective combat teams and spearheaded the attack by destroying 4 enemy occupied bunkers. He then raced some 200 meters under heavy enemy fire to reach an adjoining platoon which had begun to falter. After rallying this unit and assisting their wounded, SSG Bondsteel returned to his own sector with critically needed munitions. Without pausing he moved to the forefront and destroyed 4 enemy occupied bunkers and a machine gun which had threatened his advancing platoon. Although painfully wounded by an enemy grenade, SSG Bondsteel refused medical attention and continued his assault by neutralizing 2 more enemy bunkers nearby. While searching one of these emplacements SSG Bondsteel narrowly escaped death when an enemy soldier detonated a grenade at close range. Shortly thereafter, he ran to the aid of a severely wounded officer and struck down an enemy soldier who was threatening the officer's life. SSG Bondsteel then continued to rally his men and led them through the entrenched enemy until his company was relieved. His exemplary leadership and great personal courage throughout the 4-hour battle ensured the success of his own and nearby units, and resulted in the saving of numerous lives of his fellow soldiers. By individual acts of bravery he destroyed 10 enemy bunkers and accounted for a large toll of the enemy, including 2 key enemy commanders. His extraordinary heroism at the risk of his life was in the highest traditions of military service and reflect great credit upon him, his unit, and the U.S. Army.

See also

 List of Medal of Honor recipients for the Vietnam War

References

External links
 
 
 

1947 births
1987 deaths
People from Jonesville, Michigan
People from Jackson, Michigan
People from Matanuska-Susitna Borough, Alaska
Military personnel from Michigan
Recipients of the Soldier's Medal
Recipients of the Gallantry Cross (Vietnam)
Road incident deaths in Alaska
United States Army Medal of Honor recipients
Vietnam War recipients of the Medal of Honor